Pacific 231 is a 1949 short film directed by French film theorist Jean Mitry.

Music
The film soundtrack uses the orchestral work of the same name, composed by Arthur Honegger.

Summary
Pacific 231 pays tribute to the steam locomotive, and includes close-up footage of driving wheels, running gear and railroad operations, mostly taken at speed, and cut/choreographed to the music.

Accolades
The film was awarded the Short Film Palme d'Or, the highest prize given for a short film at the 1949 Cannes Film Festival.

References

External links
Pacific 231 on Vimeo
Pacific 231 (1949) on IMDb
Internet Archive

1949 films
French short films
Rail transport films
Short Film Palme d'Or winners
French black-and-white films